Ghoveyleh may refer to:
 Ghoveyleh-ye Naqed
 Ghoveyleh-ye Sadat